The Law Divine is a 1920 silent British crime film directed by H. B. Parkinson and Challis Sanderson. The film is considered to be lost.

Cast
 H. V. Esmond as Captain Jack le Bras
 Eva Moore as Edie le Bas
 Evelyn Brent as Daphne Grey
 Mary Brough as Cook
 Leonard Upton as Ted le Bas
 John Reid as Bill le Bas
 Dorothy Wordsworth as Claudia Merton
 Florence Wood as Mrs. Gaythorne
 Margaret Watson as Kate

References

External links

1920 films
1920 crime films
1920 lost films
British crime films
British silent feature films
British black-and-white films
Films directed by H. B. Parkinson
Films directed by Challis Sanderson
Lost British films
Lost crime films
1920s British films